Evelyn Hecht-Galinski (born 1949, in Berlin) is a German activist, an outspoken critic of Israel's policies towards Palestinians and a member of the group European Jews for a Just Peace. She is a daughter of Heinz Galinski, a former president of the Central Council of Jews in Germany.

In a highly publicized interview with German radio, Hecht-Galinski described the Central Council as the "mouthpiece of the Israeli government in Germany," criticized "Israel's criminal actions," and equated Israeli policies with those of Nazi Germany. 

The German journalist Henryk Broder wrote a letter to the radio program criticizing Ms. Hecht-Galinski, saying: "Her specialty is intellectually vapid anti-semitic anti-Zionist phrases -- such as are currently in fashion."  Following the publication of Broder's letter on the blog Achse des Guten (The Axis of Good),  Hecht-Galinski sued for libel of her description as being "anti-Semitic". In September 2008 the  ruled that he must not repeat this statement, a decision which Broder successfully appealed. In June 2009, the regional court in Cologne dismissed her defamation suit.

References

External links 
 "What is a Jew in Germany Permitted to Say Against a Jew in Germany?", by John Rosenthal, World Politics Review. 
 "Ex-German Jewish leader’s daughter slams Zionist lobby in Germany", by World Association of International Studies, Stanford University, CA. 
 "Jew-vs.-Jew Fight in Germany Reignites? Debate on Anti-Zionism", by Marc Perelman, The Forward
 "Jewish Israel critic labeled anti-Semite", by B. Weinthal, The Jerusalem Post. 

                   

1949 births
Living people
People from Berlin
20th-century German Jews